HMS Archer is the lead ship of the . As the lead ship she was one of several of her class to be completed in 1985 by Watercraft Marine, the original shipbuilders — most of the remaining vessels were completed or built by Vosper Thornycroft. In 2015, she was one of the first of her class to receive an upgrade.

Operational history

Early service
The Archer class were built as Royal Naval Reserve (RNR) training vessels, but after limited use they were transferred to URNU service.

Between 1989 and 1991, just before Archers handover to the URNU, she was commanded by (then) Lieutenant Tim Fraser, who subsequently achieved the rank of Admiral, and is the former Vice-Chief of the Defence Staff.

URNU service

Archer became the training ship of the Aberdeen URNU in 1991, succeeding Chaser. The role of a training ship within an URNU is to provide opportunities for students to receive practical training and gain experience afloat. Archers programme is generally divided into two durations of training – a weekend or the longer deployments that take place during the university Easter and summer holidays.

Deployments in the Easter and summer holidays venture further afield, Archer has visited ports from the Western Isles and east coast of Britain to the Republic of Ireland, the Netherlands, Norway and the Baltic.

Between 1991 and 1993 she was commanded by (then) Lieutenant John Clink who subsequently achieved flag rank. 

The Aberdeen URNU operated from 1967 until 2012 before being moved to Edinburgh. In the summer of 2012, the ship was moved to Rosyth Dockyard to serve with URNU East Scotland and to increase the presence of the RN in Edinburgh.

Crew composition
Archer is permanently crewed by five RN personnel, and is captained by a lieutenant. Chief petty officer fills the role of executive officer and a Petty Officer is the marine engineering officer, and the yeoman and Deputy Marine engineering officer are junior rates of the appropriate service branches. With students embarked (up to a maximum of 10), a training officer is usually present who is typically a RNR lieutenant or sub-lieutenant.

Affiliates
 
 Stonehaven SCC TS Carron

Notes

References

External links

 
 

 

Archer-class patrol vessels
1985 ships